Arven was a German symphonic metal band from Frankfurt that has released two studio albums to date. The group referred to their style as 'Melodic metal'.

History 
Arven was founded in 2006 by guitarist and songwriter Anastasia Schmidt. Looking for female musicians, keyboard player Lena Yatsula and guitarist Ines Thomé joined the band. For the vocals, the classically trained Carina Hanselmann was added. In May 2009, bassist Lisa Marie Geiss replaced Eve Kreuzer. As the only man of the sextet, drummer Till Felden joined the band.

In 2011, Arven signed a record contract with Massacre Records. Their debut album, Music of Light, was published on 30 September 2011. The album was mastered by Sascha Paeth and Michael Rodenberg. The album cover was designed by Jan Yrlund. The second album Black Is the Colour was released on 23 August 2013.

In 2015, Arven announced in their official website that they have officially disbanded due to musical differences and difficulties finding a replacement for the guitarist Ines Thomé, who left the band.

Line-up 
Current members
Lisa Geiß – bass
Till Felden (DreamReaver, Fallen Temple) – drums
Lena Yatsula – keyboards
Carina Hanselmann – vocals
Anastasia Schmidt (ex-A.Death.Experience, ex-Elvenpath, ex-Epicedium, ex-Hagatyr) – guitars (2006–present)
Previous members
Verena Reinhardt (Sugar of the Universe) – bass guitar (?–2009)
Eva Kreuzer (DreamReaver, Illusoria, ex-A.Death.Experience, ex-Heresy, ex-Misfit) – bass guitar, vocals
Ines Thomé – guitarist (?–2014)
Reseda Streb – vocals
Live-members
Benjamin Reiter (Awaiting Dawn) – bass guitar (2010–2011), guitarist (2013–present)

Discography 
Demos
Demo (2008)
Intro (00:44)
Ruined Castle (04:01)
Music of Light (04:10)
On Flaming Wings (03:41)
A Stranger's Story (07:06)

Studio albums
Music of Light (2011)
Music of Light (04:21)
On Flaming Wings (04:50)
Raise Your Cups (04:29)
My Dear Friend (07:01)
World of Hatred (05:19)
Dark Red Desire (04:12)
Midwinter Nights (05:02)
Till Death Do Us Apart (05:53)
Ruined Castle (04:04)
A Stranger's Story (06:30)
Black Is the Colour (2013)
Believe (04:11)
Don't Look Back (04:40)
Rainsong (04:25)
The One for Me (featuring Stefan Schmidt) (06:28)
All I Got (06:35)
My Darkest Dream (04:52)
Cercle d'Émeraude – Instrumental (04:23)
In Your Dreams (05:18)
Fireside Stories (04:09)
My Fall (06:48)

References 

German symphonic metal musical groups
Massacre Records artists
Musical groups established in 2006
2006 establishments in Germany
Musical groups disestablished in 2015
2015 disestablishments in Germany